Tulú is a corregimiento in Penonomé District, Coclé Province, Panama with a population of 4,624 as of 2010. Its population as of 1990 was 3,923; its population as of 2000 was 4,294.

References

Corregimientos of Coclé Province